Wanganella may refer to:

Wanganella, New South Wales, a town in Australia
MS Wanganella, a passenger liner
Wanganella (gastropod), a genus of sea snails